"Running Low" is a song by Belgian drum and bass record producer Netsky. The song features vocals by American singer-songwriter Beth Ditto. It was written by Ditto, Netsky, Takura Tendayi and Zane Lowe. The single was released on 3 August 2014 as a digital download in the United Kingdom and Belgium (and two weeks later in the US). It was released through Sony Music Entertainment and Epic Records as Netsky's major label debut.

The song topped the Belgian Singles Charts and became Netsky's first number-one single.

Background and release
The song was premiered on 5 June 2014 on BBC Radio 1, where Zane Lowe named the track "Hottest Record in the World". During the show, Netsky announced his plans for the track to be included in his upcoming third studio album, III. However, it was later revealed that the song would not feature on the record. The full track was unveiled through Netsky's official SoundCloud page and through UKF Music's Drum & Bass channel on YouTube the same day.

Remixes
The remix EP for "Running Low" features an extended mix of the track, a drum and bass remix by Hospital Records artists (and former labelmates) Fred V & Grafix, and remixes by house/garage musicians Todd Edwards and Wookie.  The Fred V & Grafix Remix was also premiered through UKF Drum & Bass on 17 July. A one-and-a-half-minute-long video for the remix was published on 8 August through the official Hospital Records YouTube channel as well.

Music video
A music video to accompany the release of "Running Low" was first published onto YouTube through Netsky's Vevo channel on 10 July 2014. It runs at a total length of three minutes and forty-four seconds.

Track listing

Credits and personnel
Lead vocals – Beth Ditto
Record producer – Netsky
Label: Sony Music Entertainment, Epic Records

Chart performance

Weekly charts

Year-end charts

Release history

References

2014 singles
2014 songs
Beth Ditto songs
Netsky (musician) songs
Epic Records singles
Number-one singles in Belgium
Songs written by Beth Ditto
Songs written by Takura